Karen Bryan OBE FRCSLT, is a speech therapist, and Vice Chancellor of York St John University since April 2020. Prior to this, Bryan was Deputy Vice Chancellor (Academic) at the University of Greenwich.

Career
Bryan qualified as a speech and language therapist from the University of Newcastle and also gained her PhD there. Her research interests are in workforce development and the effectiveness of interventions for communication disorders associated with stroke, dementia and other neurological conditions.

Bryan was Head of the School of Health and Social Care at the University of Surrey before moving, in 2013, to the position of Pro Vice-Chancellor for its Faculty of Health and Wellbeing at Sheffield Hallam University. She was the Deputy Vice-Chancellor (Academic) at the University of Greenwich and Chair of the University Schools Trust. In April 2020, Bryan became the new Vice Chancellor of York St John University.
She is also a visiting professor in the Department of Neuropsychology at the University of Warsaw.

Bryan was elected a Fellow of the Royal College of Speech and Language Therapists in 2011, and awarded an OBE in the 2018 New Year Honours for services to Higher Education.

References

Living people
British women academics
Speech and language pathologists
Fellows of the Royal College of Speech and Language Therapists
Academics of the University of Greenwich
Alumni of Newcastle University
Officers of the Order of the British Empire
Year of birth missing (living people)